Bettye Jane Danoff (née Mims; May 21, 1923 – December 22, 2011) was an American professional golfer. She was one of the 13 founding members of the LPGA, in 1950.

Danoff began playing golf at age 6. Her parents had opened a driving range and nine-hole golf course in Grand Prairie Texas. She also played under the names Bettye Mims White and Bettye Mims Danoff.

The LPGA Tour was not founded until 1950. Before then, she won four straight Dallas Women's Golf Association Championships in addition to two Texas Women's Amateur Championship. In 1947, she defeated Babe Zaharias, 1 up, in the Texas Women's Open. Zaharias had won 17 consecutive tournaments before losing to Danoff. Also before her LPGA days, Danoff played exhibitions with PGA Tour stars.

Danoff was a mother to three daughters who traveled with her as she played off the LPGA Tour. After the death of her husband in 1961, Danoff played in a limited number of tournaments. She was the LPGA Tour's first grandmother.

Amateur wins
1947 Texas Women's Amateur
1948 Texas Women's Amateur

Professional wins (1)

1953 Hardscrabble Open

References

External links

American female golfers
LPGA Tour golfers
Golfers from Dallas
1923 births
2011 deaths
21st-century American women